Eamon JR Grennan (born 13 November 1941) is an Irish poet born in Dublin, Ireland. He attended University College Dublin where he completed a BA 1963 and an MA 1964. He has lived in the United States, except for brief periods, since 1964.  He was the Dexter M. Ferry Jr. Professor of English at Vassar College until his retirement in 2004.

Biography
Though his Irish roots are clear in his poetry, Grennan has an international sense of literary tradition. He has cited as influences American poets including Robert Frost and Elizabeth Bishop (herself an international poet with ties to the U.S., Canada, and Brazil). In addition to writing poetry, he has translated Giacomo Leopardi and—with his wife, Vassar classicist Rachel Kitzinger—Sophocles's Oedipus at Colonus.

Grennan studied English and Italian at University College, Dublin, where he met poets Derek Mahon and Eavan Boland, and at Harvard University, and began teaching at Vassar in 1974. He returned to Ireland fairly briefly, first in 1977 and later in 1981, and began writing poetry there. His first book, Wildly for Days, was published in 1983. Gaelic poetry became an important influence, particularly, he has said, on the sound of his poems. At the same time, he is interested in the sentence as a poetic unit as well as a prose unit. In an interview with Timothy Cahill, Grennan said:
 I have, it's a toothache quality, a kind of pain -- the ambition to make a sentence that is full, that has not gone limp, hasn't stopped while it still has some elasticity in it.
Grennan's career has been long, productive and distinguished, and he has earned from fellow poets a reputation for lyrical skill and psychological intensity. Former U.S. Poet Laureate Billy Collins said of Grennan:
 Few poets are as generous as Eamon Grennan in the sheer volume of delight his poems convey, and fewer still are as attentive to the marvels of the earth. To read him is to be led on a walk through the natural world of clover and cricket and, most of all, light, and to face with an open heart the complexity of being human.

He received the PEN Award for Poetry in Translation in 1998. Grennan was nominated for the 2008 Poetry Now Award for his collection, Out of Breath.

Works 
 There Now. Minneapolis, MN: Graywolf, 2016.
 But the Body. Gallery Books, Ireland, 2012.
 Out of Sight: New & Selected Poems. Minneapolis, MN: Graywolf, 2010.
 Matter of Fact. St. Paul, MN: Graywolf, 2008.
 Out of Breath. Gallery Books, Ireland, 2007.
 The Quick of It. Gallery Books, Ireland, 2004.
 The Quick of It. St. Paul, MN: Graywolf, 2005.
 Sophocles, Oedipus at Colonus. Trans. with Rachel Kitzinger. Oxford, 2004.
 Renvyle, Winter. Philadelphia: Pointed Press, 2003.
 Still Life with Waterfall. Gallery Books, Ireland, 2001.
 Still Life with Waterfall. St. Paul, MN: Graywolf, 2002.
 Selected & New Poems. Dublin: Gallery Press, 2000.
 Provincetown Sketches. Aralia Press, 2000.
 Facing the Music: Irish Poetry in the Twentieth Century. Omaha: Creighton University Press, 1999.
 Relations: New & Selected Poems. St. Paul, MN: Graywolf, 1998.
 Selected Poems of Giacomo Leopardi. Trans. Princeton: Lockert Library of Poetry in Translation, Princeton University Press, 1997.
 So It Goes. Gallery Books, Ireland, 1995.
 So It Goes. St. Paul, MN: Graywolf, 1995.
 As If It Matters. Gallery Books, Ireland, 1991.
 As If It Matters. St. Paul, MN: Graywolf, 1992.
 What Light There Is. Gallery Books, Ireland, 1987.
 What Light There Is and Other Poems. New York: North Point Press, 1989.
 Twelve Poems. San Francisco: Occasional Works, 1988.
 Wildly for Days. Dublin: Gallery Press, 1983.
 Cat Scat. North Point Press, 1988.

Individual poems 
 "Soul Music: The Derry Air" The New Yorker 60/48 (14 Jan 1985) : 32

References

External links 
 Interview with Timothy Cahill
 Biography from Branching Out
 Three Poems, in Narrative Magazine (Fall 2008).
 
 
 Stuart A. Rose Manuscript, Archives, and Rare Book Library

1941 births
Living people
Irish poets
Harvard University alumni
Vassar College faculty
Alumni of University College Dublin